Mahanad is a gram panchayat, or village, in Polba-Dadpur CD block in Chinsurah subdivision of Hooghly district in the Indian state of West Bengal

Geography

History 
Archaeological Survey of India (ASI) has found many historic artifacts dating from the Gupta Era in Mahanad. An ancient lord Shiva temple in Mahanad is called Jateswer Shiv Temple. Mahand has been the yogpeeth (yoga retreat) of Nath Yogis, for thousands of years.

Mahanad has an excavated site revealing a historic Kushan presence. The exploration conducted by ASI and Paresh Pal, a local antiquarian, have led to the discovery of coins of the Kushan and Gupta dynasties and terracotta, mostly of Gupta style.

Location 
It has an average elevation of 15 metres above sea level. Mahanad is located around 19 kilometer away from its district headquarters, Hugli-Chuchura. The nearest railway station is Pandua in the Howrah-Bardhaman main line around 7 km away.

Temple and attractions 
 Mahanad Kali Temple also Called Brahmamoyee Kali Mandir (Established in 1830).
 Jateswer Shiva Mandir, 18th century temple of Nath sect in Hooghly district

Education

Primary and secondary education 
 Spark School, (established in 2012) CBSE, English Medium School
 Mahanad High School,(Established in 1963) Bengali Medium School
 Ramkrishna High School, (Established in 1984) Bengali Medium School
 Institute of Little Star, (English Medium School)
 Shitala Prathamik Vidyalaya
 Sima Prathamik Vidyalaya
 Harmala Primary School
 Ramakrishna Vidyapith

Festivals 
Kali Puja and Maha Shivaratri are festivals celebrated in Mahanad. Lakshmi Puja and Saraswati Puja are widely celebrated at Mahanad as well. Shivratri Mela (fair) is the biggest fair observed at Mahanad  each year, during the Maha Shivaratri festival.

Economy 

 Alpine Distilleries
 Matribhumi Rice Mills LlP
 Matri Mandir Himghar (P) Ltd

Banks: At Mahanad, there are branches of banks such as Central Bank Of India (Mahanadnagarpara Branch),Central Bank Of India (Ramnathpur Branch), Bandhan Bank (Mahanad), Ujjivan Small Finance Bank .

Mahanad picture gallery

References 

Villages in Hooghly district